The Arena Football League Most Valuable Player Award (AFL MVP) is an award given by the Arena Football League (AFL) to the arena football player who is considered most valuable to his team in the AFL. From 1996 to 2010, the League did not award an MVP.

References

External links
AFL All-Time Award Winners

Arena Football League trophies and awards